Employee stock ownership, or employee share ownership, is where a company's employees own shares in that company (or in the parent company of a group of companies). US employees typically acquire shares through a share option plan. In the UK, Employee Share Purchase Plans are common, wherein deductions are made from an employee's salary to purchase shares over time.  In Australia it is common to have all employee plans that provide employees with $1,000 worth of shares on a tax free basis.  Such plans may be selective or all-employee plans. Selective plans are typically only made available to senior executives. All-employee plans offer participation to all employees (subject to certain qualifying conditions such as a minimum length of service).

Most corporations use stock ownership plans as a form of an employee benefit. Plans in public companies generally limit the total number or the percentage of the company's stock that may be acquired by employees under a plan. Compared with worker cooperatives or co-determination, employee share ownership may not confer any meaningful control or influence by employees in governing and managing the corporation.

Some companies, particularly private companies, use employee share ownership to support a company's culture.  Employee ownership is when all employees together own a substantial stake and have a meaningful voice in the company (or group) that employs them.

A number of countries have introduced tax advantaged share or share option plans to encourage employee share ownership.

Types of plan
To facilitate employee stock ownership, companies may allocate their employees with stock, which may be at no upfront cost to the employee, enable the employee to purchase stock, which may be at a discount, or grant employees stock options. Shares allocated to employees may have a holding period before the employee takes ownership of the shares (known as vesting). The vesting of shares and the exercise of a stock option may be subject to individual or business performance conditions.

Various types of employee stock ownership plans are common in most industrial and some developing countries. Executive plans are designed to recruit and reward senior or key employees. In the U.S. and the UK there is a widespread practice of sharing this kind of ownership broadly with employees through plans in which participation is offered to all employees. The tax rules for employee share ownership vary widely from country to country. Only a few, most notably the U.S., the UK, and Ireland have significant tax laws to encourage broad-based employee share ownership. For example, in the U.S. there are specific rules for Employee Stock Ownership Plans (ESOPs). In the UK there are two all-employee tax advantaged plans that enable employees to acquire shares: the Share Incentive Plan and the Sharesave share option plan.

Varieties of employee share ownership plan (including associated cash based incentive plans) include:

Direct purchase plans
Direct purchase plans simply allow employees to buy shares in the company with their own money. In several countries, there are special tax-qualified plans that allow employees to buy stock either at a discount or with matching shares from the company. For instance, in the U.S., employee stock purchase plans enable employees to put aside after-tax pay over some period of time (typically 6–12 months) then use the accumulated funds to buy shares at up to a 15% discount at either the price at the time of purchase or the time when they started putting aside the money, whichever is lower. In the U.K., Share Incentive Plans allow employee purchases that can be matched directly by the company.

Stock options

Stock options give employees the right to buy a number of shares at a price fixed at grant for a defined number of years into the future. Options, and all the plans listed below, can be given to any employee under whatever rules the company creates, with limited exceptions in various countries.

Restricted stock
Restricted stock and its close relative restricted stock units give employees the right to acquire or receive shares, by gift or purchase, once certain restrictions, such as working a certain number of years or meeting a performance target, are met.

Phantom stock
Phantom stock pays a future cash bonus equal to the value of a certain number of shares.

Stock appreciation rights
Stock appreciation rights provide the right to the increase in the value of a designated number of shares, usually paid in cash but occasionally settled in shares (this is called a "stock–settled" SAR).

Employee ownership

Employee ownership is a way of running a business that can work for different sized businesses in diverse sectors.

Employee ownership requires employees to own a significant and meaningful stake in their company. The size of the shareholding must be significant.  This is accepted as meaning where 25 percent or more of the ownership of the company is broadly held by all or most employees (or on their behalf by a trust). There are three basic forms of employee ownership:

 direct ownership of shares by all employees as individuals; 
 indirect (or trust) ownership on behalf of all employees by the trustee of an employee trust; and 
 the hybrid model which combines both direct and indirect ownership.

In addition, the employees’ stake must give employees a meaningful voice in the company's affairs by it underpinning organisational structures that promote employee engagement in the company.

Employee ownership can be seen as a business model in its own right, in contrast to employee share ownership which may only provide selected employees with shares in their company and an insignificant overall shareholding.

In the UK organisations such as the Employee Ownership Association (EOA), Scottish Enterprise, Wales Co-operative Centre and Co-operatives UK play an active role in promoting employee ownership.

An employee controlled company is a majority employee-owned company. This might arise through an employee-buyout. This can be set up through an employee ownership trust. Employee-owned companies are totally or significantly owned (directly or indirectly) by their employees.

Different forms of employee ownership, and the principles that underlie them, have contributed to the emergence of an international social enterprise movement.  A public service mutual, by definition, has a significant degree of employee ownership, influence or control, but most public service mutuals identify themselves as social enterprises rather than employee owned.

A worker cooperative is a cooperative owned and self-managed by its workers. It is a type of employee owned company that operates according to the international values of co-operation and adheres to an additional code, beyond the core international principles, focused on democracy and participation in the workplace. The most celebrated (and studied) case of a group of companies based wholly on co-operative principles is the Spanish Mondragon Cooperative Corporation. Spanish law, however, requires that members of the Mondragon Corporation are registered as self-employed and are not employees. This further differentiates this type of co-operative ownership (in which self-employed owner-members each have one voting share, or shares are controlled by a co-operative legal entity) from employee ownership (where ownership is typically held as a block of shares on behalf of employees using an employee ownership trust, or company rules embed mechanisms for distributing shares to employees and ensuring they remain majority shareholders).

By country

United Kingdom 

Employee Share Ownership Plans (ESOPs) became widespread for a short period in the UK under the government of Margaret Thatcher, particularly following the Transport Act 1985, which deregulated and then privatised bus services. Councils seeking to protect workers ensured that employees accessed shares as privatisation took place, but employee owners soon lost their shares as they were bought up and bus companies were taken over. The disappearance of stock plans was dramatic.

United States 

In the United States, there is a widespread practice of employee stock ownership. It began with industrial companies and today is particularly common in the technology sector but also companies in other industries, such as Whole Foods Market and Starbucks.

In his 2020 Presidential campaign, Bernie Sanders proposed that 20% of stocks in corporations with over $100 million in annual revenue be owned by the corporation's workers.

See also

 Center on Business and Poverty
 Co-determination
 Worker representation on corporate boards of directors
 Cooperative
 Worker cooperative
 Economics of participation
 Employee benefit trust
 Labour law
 List of employee-owned companies
 Market socialism
 Social ownership

References

Further reading

 
 Curl, John (2009) For All The People: Uncovering the Hidden History of Cooperation, Cooperative Movements, and Communalism in America, PM Press, 
 

 
 
Types of business entity